Sigifredo Solís Solís Hydroelectric Center is a hydroelectric power project located in San Ramón, Alajuela province, Costa Rica. It is operated by CONELECTRICAS R.L., a consortium of power utilities companies in the north of the country.

History 

The project was created under the Law 8345, for the electrification of rural areas in the country. The project name is Proyecto Hidroeléctrico Pocosol – Agua Gata.

Operation

Hydroelectric centers 
There are two small dams with their own power plants in the project, Pocosol and Agua Gata.

Pocosol is 7m high and 50m wide. The canal to the power station is 3.6 km long for 19.5m³/s flow. There are two 12MW generators.

Agua Gata is 5m high and 30m wide. There is one 2MW generator.

References

Hydroelectric power stations in Costa Rica